Rangi Deh (also Romanized as Rangī Deh; also known as Rangdeh and Zangī Deh) is a village in Rudasht-e Sharqi Rural District, Bon Rud District, Isfahan County, Isfahan Province, Iran. At the 2006 census, its population was 151, in 40 families.

References 

Populated places in Isfahan County